KBR Development was an American professional stock car racing team that last competed in the ARCA Menards Series. The team, founded by Mike Bursley in 2018, last fielded the No. 28 Chevrolet SS part-time for David Gravel. Veteran ARCA driver Frank Kimmel served as the team's general manager. KBR Development had a technical alliance with GMS Racing.

ARCA Menards Series

Car No. 35/28 history

2018 
In 2018, the team would make their debut at Toledo Speedway, with Carson Hocevar driving the No. 35 for the team. Hocevar would finish 11th.

2019 
On January 11, 2019, the team announced that they had entered a technical alliance with GMS Racing, with equipment bought from MDM Motorsports. Carson Hocevar would drive 11 races for the team, with Brandon McReynolds driving mostly big tracks for the team.

2020 
The team would plan to make their second full-time season in 2020, with the team relocating to Statesville, North Carolina and becoming a satellite team of GMS Racing.

On January 10, 2020, the team would announce that dirt racer David Gravel would make his stock car debut for the team, driving the No. 28 at the 2020 Lucas Oil 200.

On January 27, 2020, Venturini Motorsports accused that former employees, Frank Kimmel and Griffin Rider, both who were now employees at KBR Development, had stolen information from the team. Venturini Motorsports had said that in security camera footage, Rider had carried the crew chief's computer into an unknown hauler, had spent approximately 11 minutes with the computer, and returned it, with Rider allegedly stealing information with a USB flash drive. In addition, Venturini Motorsports testified that Kimmel took pictures of Venturini Motorsports' cars.

On May 9, 2020, the team would announce on its website that the team had ceased operations in a statement from Mike Bursley.

Car No. 35/28 results 
(key) (Bold – Pole position awarded by qualifying time. Italics – Pole position earned by points standings or practice time. * – Most laps led.)

References

External links 

 

NASCAR teams
American auto racing teams